The 1970 Giro d'Italia was the 53rd edition of the Giro d'Italia, one of cycling's Grand Tours. The Giro began in San Pellegrino Terme on 18 May, and Stage 10 occurred on 28 May with a stage to Rivisondoli. The race finished in Bolzano on 7 June. For the first time in the Giro, antidoping tests were carried out in the year 1968. The outcomes, though, were communicated only at the end of the race and caused some perplexity and dispute. Even after some counter-tests, Delisle, Motta, Abt, Bodrero, Van Schil, Galera, Diaz and Di Toro were proven positive.

Stage 1
18 May 1970 — San Pellegrino Terme to Biandronno,

Stage 2
19 May 1970 — Comerio to Saint-Vincent,

Stage 3
20 May 1970 — Saint-Vincent to Aosta,

Stage 4
21 May 1970 — Saint-Vincent to Lodi,

Stage 5

Stage 6
23 May 1970 —  to Malcesine,

Stage 7
24 May 1970 — Malcesine to Brentonico,

Stage 8
25 May 1970 — Rovereto to Bassano del Grappa,

Stage 9
26 May 1970 — Bassano del Grappa to Treviso,  (ITT)

Rest day
27 May 1970

Stage 10
28 May 1970 — Terracina to Rivisondoli,

References

1970 Giro d'Italia
Giro d'Italia stages